Mehmet Tümkan (born 2 October 1943) is a Turkish middle-distance runner. He competed in the men's 800 metres at the 1972 Summer Olympics.

References

1943 births
Living people
Athletes (track and field) at the 1972 Summer Olympics
Turkish male middle-distance runners
Olympic athletes of Turkey
Place of birth missing (living people)
Mediterranean Games bronze medalists for Turkey
Mediterranean Games medalists in athletics
Athletes (track and field) at the 1971 Mediterranean Games
20th-century Turkish people